Eskovina is a monotypic genus of Asian dwarf spiders containing the single species, Eskovina clava. It was first described by A. O. Kocak & M. Kemal in 2006, and has only been found in China, Korea, and Russia.

See also
 List of Linyphiidae species (A–H)

References

Linyphiidae
Monotypic Araneomorphae genera
Spiders of Asia
Spiders of Russia